The Winans family is a U.S. family of gospel music artists from Detroit, Michigan.

Family members

 David "Pop" Winans Sr. (father; b. April 20, 1934  – d. April 8, 2009)
 Delores "Mom" Winans (mother; b. September 22, 1936)
 David Winans II (oldest, sibling #1)–(b. September 24, 1954); married to Deborah Ann Coduto-Winans II (b. August 23, 1956; d. December 2007). Children: daughter, Seven Simone Winans.
 Ronald Winans (sibling #2) (b. June 30, 1956; d. June 17, 2005)

 Marvin Winans (sibling #3 twin)–(March 5, 1958); was married to Vickie; children: Marvin Jr; Mario (stepson) and Josiah
 Carvin Winans (sibling #4 twin)–(March 5, 1958); is married to Cherie Winans; children Carvin Winans Jr.; Juan;Deborah Joy; Ian Winans; Shannaiah Winans; and Laylah Winans
 Michael Winans Sr. (sibling #5) (b. June 5, 1959) married to Regina; children: Mike (Michael Jr); LaShay
 Daniel Winans (sibling #6) (b. July 22, 1961)  married to Sybil; children: Daniel Jr; Jeremy; Kacy
 Benjamin "BeBe" Winans Sr. (sibling #7) (b. September 17, 1962); formerly married to Debra Johnson; Children: Miya D. Winans and Benjamin Winans Jr.
 Priscilla "CeCe" Winans (sibling #8) (b. October 8, 1964) married: Alvin Love Jr; children: Ashley; Alvin Love III.
 Angelique Winans-Caldwell (sibling #9) (b. March 4, 1968)  – married: Cedric Caldwell; Children: Ryan, Jalon and Jade 
 Debra Renee Winans-Lowe (sibling #10) (b. September 3, 1972) – married: James Lowe; Children: James Jr., Jayson and Jackson

Recording artists and groups within the family

Mom and Pop Winans
Delores and David Winans recorded together as "Mom and Pop Winans" and separately at various times as "Mom", "Pop", "David" or "Delores". They received a Grammy nomination for their CD "Mom & Pop Winans" in 1989. Delores is currently signed to daughter CeCe's label PureSprings Gospel. Delores and David met while in the Lucille Lemon Choir conducted by James Cleveland. They organized yearly Christmas concerts at Mercy Hall in which their ten children participated.

The Winans
Brothers Ronald, Carvin, Marvin, and Michael Winans (the second, third, fourth and fifth siblings) are known professionally as The Winans. They were discovered by Andrae Crouch, who signed them to Light Records. Their first record, Introducing The Winans was produced in 1981. Their style was noted for its crossover efforts and received airplay on R&B radio. The group's last recording was in 1995, but they have subsequently been involved in various Winans family projects where they are credited as "The Winans" (e.g. November 2000's Christmas: Our Gifts To You).

David Winans II
David Winans II is an instrumentalist; first as bassist for "The Winanaires", the earliest version of the Winans as a gospel quartet, before they became "The Testimonial Singers".  While they were the "Testimonial Singers", David switched to guitars. After the change to "The Winans", David continued to play guitar under the production of Bill Maxwell, and then Quincy Jones' label Qwest records for the Grammy award-winning "Let My People Go" album.  David also has solo Christian rock projects, Xairia, DWP, and more recently, David Winans' pi. With the group pi in existence David has won 10 Detroit Music Awards for Outstanding Songwriter, Outstanding Instrumentalist and Outstanding Performance. He also won Outstanding Instrumentalist with his premiere recording with Righteous Through God. And most recently 3 Detroit Music Awards for the song, 'Will You Bring Me There Again' which he collaborated with Joya Koch, on lyrics. He was married to Deborah Ann Coduto Winans (she died due to illness in 2007) with whom he had a daughter, Seven Simone.

Ron Winans Family & Friends
In addition to his involvement with The Winans, Ron released a solo album in the late 1980s on the EMI Gospel label, and recorded a series of five CDs, Ron Winans Family & Friends). 
He also co-founded, with Gladys Knight, the Gladys and Ron's Chicken & Waffles restaurant chain. Ronald Winans died in 2005.

Carvin Winans
Carvin was a member of the Winans with his brothers. During his first five years with the Winans, Carvin not only wrote for the project but had begun producing some of their albums. In 1987, as part of the Winans, he was a backing vocalist on Michael Jackson's Bad.  Carvin now resides in Canada where he won Family Feud Canada.

In 2002, Carvin performed on a sold out world tour with the Winans family in front of millions of fans which closed out in Detroit at the Fox Theatre. In October 2007 he was inducted in the Gospel Music Hall of Fame in Nashville Tennessee along with his brothers.  On June 18, 2008 Carvin received the President's Merit Award from the Recording Academy in recognition of his extraordinary gifts as a passionate singer, performer, expressive communicator, and pioneer of contemporary gospel music. He has 5 Grammy's and 3 Gold Records, several NAACP Awards and Soul Train Awards after 30 years in the business with minimal success. He worked with such greats as Michael Jackson, Stevie Wonder, Quincy Jones, Whitney Houston, Peabo Bryson, Kenny Loggins, Brian McKnight, Michael McDonald and Anita Baker, just to name a few.  In 2019, he released his first solo debut album In The Softest Way which featured album production himself alongside Jimmy Jam and Terry Lewis. Album singles: "Once In A Lifetime", "A Little Love", and "Misunderstood". Carvin now lives in Canada where he won Family Feud Canada.

Marvin Winans
Marvin Winans has focused on work as the pastor of Perfecting Church in Detroit, where he continues to record albums with the church's choir, under the name Marvin Winans and the Perfected Praise Choir. Marvin, along with Delores ("Mom") and nephew Alvin Love III (sister CeCe's son), signed to CeCe's record label PureSprings Gospel. PureSprings Gospel released Marvin's album Alone But Not Alone in September 2007. He has also founded the Marvin L. Winans Academy of Performing Arts, which opened in 1997.

Michael and Regina Winans
Michael Winans has performed and released several recordings with wife Regina, including the independent album Be Yourself. The album featured background vocals provided by their children Mike (Michael Jr) and LaShay. Their third CD was released in January 2008.

Daniel Winans
Born in Detroit, Michigan, Daniel Winans is the sixth sibling. Daniel has gone on to win his own Grammy Award for Best Soul Gospel Performance by a Duo or Group, Choir or Chorus and is a three-time Grammy nominee.

Discography
1987: Daniel & Second Half
1989: Brotherly Love (won Grammy for the title cut)
1991: My Point of View
1994: Not in My House
2011: First Love; guest appearance by Andrae' Crouch on the remake of Crouch's "Jesus Is The Answer"
2014: Family (Danz Music Productions/BMI/BMG teams up with MCRi Music Distribution)

BeBe & CeCe Winans
Youngest brother and seventh sibling Benjamin (BeBe Winans) recorded with younger sister and eighth sibling Priscilla (CeCe Winans) as BeBe & CeCe Winans. Premiering as background vocalists for Andrae Crouch in the 70s, BeBe & CeCe  went on to become singers for the PTL Club at Heritage USA in Charlotte, NC. Leaders at The PTL gave BeBe & CeCe a song to sing together, called Up Where We Belong from the 1982 movie An Officer and a Gentleman. Adding a gospel twist, the name and lyrics were changed to "Lord Lift Us Up (Where We Belong)". After singing that song on the popular Christian television show, BeBe & CeCe were requested to sing on television shows, at conferences and in award shows. The two became a duo releasing their first album in 1984. BeBe & CeCe are the most popular and widely-known of the Winans Family, the first family of Gospel music. They have collaborated with greats such as their best friend, Whitney Houston. In 1991 they released their album Different Lifestyles through Sparrow which included the hits Addictive Love and It's Okay. Both Bebe and Cece subsequently recorded as solo acts, and have established solo careers. CeCe is the best-selling gospel artist of all time with 15 Grammys and a host of other awards. She has also founded the PureSprings Gospel label, which has signed a number of artists, including family members: Delores ("Mom") Winans, Marvin Winans, and CeCe's son, Alvin Love III.

Angie and Debbie Winans
Sisters Angie and Debbie Winans are the ninth and tenth of the siblings and are the youngest members of the family. In 1990 they co-wrote and performed a smooth jazz song called "Be With You" for  GospelJazz pioneer, Ben Tankard on his "Keynote Speaker" album.  The song went #1 on secular radio. Their first album, "Angie and Debbie", was released in 1993 on Capitol Records.  It included "Light of Love", which featured pop diva Whitney Houston on background vocals.  Stephanie Mills was also featured on background vocals on the song "Father, Father". Their second album, Bold (1997), contained the song "Not Natural", a song denouncing homosexuality. This led to protests by GLAAD. Angie Winans released a solo project in 2001, Melodies of My Heart. Debbie Winans later released a children's album.

Winans Phase 2
Winans Phase 2 was formed in 1998 and recorded on Myrrh Records. It consists of Marvin Winans Jr., Carvin Winans Jr., Michael Winans Jr., and Juan Winans, (son of Carvin Sr.).  Marvin Jr. started a production company called M2 Entertainment and produced songs for his mother Vickie Winans' album Woman To Woman. He also released a solo album, Image of a Man. They released one album in 1999 called We Got Next. Michael Winans Jr. signed with Sean "Diddy" Combs, writing and producing for some of the biggest artists (Chris Brown, New Edition, Case, Michelle Williams, Mario Winans, Danity Kane and Diddy himself). He was scheduled to release his album titled "My Own Genre" March 1, 2011.

3 Winans Brothers
3 Winans Brothers is a Winans brothers supergroup formed in 2013 with Carvin Winans, Marvin Winans, and BeBe Winans. September 2013, the lead single from the upcoming album "If God Be For Us" was released worldwide. The second single "Move In Me" was released July 2, 2014. Leading up to the debut album release of Foreign Land September 30, 2014, on Entertainment One Music/BMG/Regimen Records. On October 14, 2014 the album debuted #2 on Billboard Top 10 Gospel Charts.

Vickie Winans
Vickie Winans is the former wife of Marvin and a solo artist. She was also raised in a musical family in Detroit. Her debut solo album in 1987 was titled Be Encouraged.

Mario Winans
Mario Winans is a solo R&B artist. He debuted in 1997 and had a Billboard number one album in 2004. He is the son of Vickie Winans and Ronald Brown, and took the Winans name after Vickie married Marvin Winans in the late 1970s.

Marvin Winans Jr
Marvin Winans Jr, like his brother, is a solo gospel artist. He is the son of Vickie Winans and Marvin Winans.

Juan Winans
Juan Winans is a Grammy-nominated singer/songwriter. He has written for Warryn Campbell, George Huff, Joe, Lalah Hathaway,Tyler Perry, and Boyz II Men.

Television
On December 24, 1990, the family appeared on The Oprah Winfrey Show. Family members on the show included Ronald, Carvin, Marvin, and Michael  (as "The Winans"), BeBe & CeCe (as a duo), Vickie, Mom and Pop, Daniel, David, Angie, and Debbie.
On June 27 1992 the family appeared on The Arsenio Hall Show.

Deborah Joy Winans appears on OWN networks Greenleaf as Charity Greenleaf.

On March 2, 2021, Marvin's son Marvin Winans, Jr. appeared as a contestant on Wheel of Fortune.

References

External links

Cece Winans official web site
BeBe Winans official web site
Vickie Winans official web site

Angie Winans official web site
Marvin Winans Jr. official web site
Perfecting Church web site

 
 African-American history in Detroit
 American blues musical groups
 American gospel musical groups
 Family musical groups
 Singers from Detroit
 American gospel singers
 Pentecostals from Michigan
 Musical groups established in the 1980s
Thirty Tigers artists